Ariel Horowitz (born 1970) is an Israeli singer-songwriter, and the son of the late Naomi Shemer, widely regarded as one of Israel's most important songwriters. He is married to the Israeli singer Tamar Giladi.

He has released six albums: Yallah Bye (1998), Renée (2002), Menase Sefer (2004), Zman Emet (2008), Album 5 (2010), and HaGiborim Sheli (2013).

The song "Yallah Bye" was one of the most played songs on Voice of Israel, an Israeli radio station, in 1998.

References

External links
 Official website (in Hebrew)
 Israeli singer-songwriter Ariel Horowitz spoke Monday at Calcalist’s conference on music and technology in Tel Aviv

1970 births
Living people
Israeli Ashkenazi Jews
Israeli male singer-songwriters
21st-century Israeli male singers
20th-century Israeli male singers